Alastair Macaulay is an English writer and dance critic. He was the chief dance critic for The New York Times from 2007 until he retired in 2018. He was previously chief dance critic at The Times and Literary Supplement and chief theater critic of the Financial Times, both of London. He founded the British quarterly Dance Theater Journal in 1983.  He writes that his first morning in New York City was before September 1981. In addition to his roles as critic, Macaulay has written for The New Yorker and also published a biography on Margot Fonteyn. In 2000, he wrote Matthew Bourne and His Adventures in Dance: Conversations with Alastair Macaulay with Matthew Bourne. Macaulay was named one of the New York Public Library for the Performing Arts' Jerome Robbins Dance Division Fellows in 2017. As of 2019, Macaulay was an instructor at the 92nd Street Y in New York City.

Macaulay started a controversy in 2010 when he disparagingly commented on the weight of ballet dancer Jenifer Ringer. In a review of a performance of The Nutcracker, he wrote that Ringer, as the Sugar Plum Fairy, "looked as if she'd eaten one sugar plum too many." Macaulay published a response to the controversy explaining his perspective and writing, "The body in ballet becomes a subject of the keenest observation and the most intense discussion. I am severe — but ballet, as dancers know, is more so."

References

External links 
 Alastair Macaulay's blog
DANCE MAGAZINE: Alastair Macaulay Says Goodbye: What It's Been Like as the Controversial Chief Dance Critic
Macaulay, Alastair. "Of Women, Men and Ballet in the 21st Century". New York Times  
Macaulay, Alastair, "His Moves Expressed as Much as His Music". New York Times

Year of birth missing (living people)
Living people
The New York Times writers
The Times people
American dance critics
American male journalists